"Merry-Go-Round" was the second commercial single taken from Moya Brennan's album Signature, released in the same year. The cover shows a photograph by Mella Travers.

The song was also recording for Moya Brennan's Heart Strings album.

Track listing 
Download
"Merry-Go-Round" (Special Branch remix)

References

2006 singles
Moya Brennan albums